Lophomyrtus is a genus of the myrtle family described as a genus in 1941. The entire genus is endemic to New Zealand. It consists of evergreen shrubs or trees, noted for their colorful leaves, which are purple, chocolate, red or bronze-green. There are also a number of cultivars. Planting in full sun aids the leaf color to develop. In cool climates, the plant may need to be placed in a sheltered area. They will also grow in semi shade. This genus is closely related to the Australian Lenwebbia which also has  four petals and similar though less colourful leaves.

Species

Hybrids

Most Lophomyrtus in gardens are hybrids between the two species. This cross, Lophomyrtus bullata × Lophomyrtus obcordata, is known as Lophomyrtus × ralphii and has produced many popular cultivars in a range of plant sizes and foliage colours. Among the most popular are: 'Kathryn', up to 3 m tall, deep purple-bronze foliage; 'Indian Chief', red-brown foliage that darkens in winter; 'Pixie', a compact form with small, bright, red-brown leaves; 'Little Star', a compact plant with small, rounded, cream-edged green leaves that are suffused with pink; 'Gloriosa', an upright cultivar to 2 m tall, cream-edged green leaves that develop pink tones, especially in winter; 'Black Beauty', narrow upright growth habit to 2 m tall, very dark red-brown foliage; and 'Red Dragon', up to 1.8m tall, narrow red leaves tapering to a point mature to a dark chocolate shade.

Lophomyrtus × ralphii cultivars are valued in gardens for their foliage and their ability to withstand regular trimming and shaping. Their flowers and fruit, while attractive and sometimes quite showy, are ornamentally incidental to the foliage.

References

Myrtaceae
Myrtaceae genera
Endemic flora of New Zealand
Taxa named by Max Burret